Claudia Romo Edelman (born 1971) is a Mexican-Swiss diplomat, speaker and media contributor, and an activist for equity, diversity and inclusion. Claudia has more than 25 years of experience leading marketing and advocacy for global organizations including UNICEF, the Global Fund to Fight AIDS, Tuberculosis and Malaria, United Nations High Commissioner for Refugees (UNHCR), the United Nations and the World Economic Forum. She has launched hundreds of successful campaigns and initiatives including the SDG Lions, Product (RED), and the Sustainable Development Goals. She is the co-host of "Global GoalsCast", a podcast distributed by CBS News Digital, which inspires and empowers listeners to make the world a better place by sharing the stories of people, companies, and organizations that are advancing and achieving a more sustainable world.

Claudia is the founder of We Are All Human, a foundation dedicated to advancing the agenda of equality, diversity and inclusion, making a change through collective action, and is also the founder of The Hispanic Star, which represents an unparalleled, collective goodwill effort to advance the Hispanic community, a symbol that stands for inclusion and inspires trust.

Previously  she was seconded by UNICEF to the Executive Office of the Secretary General of the United Nations, to lead communications and advocacy for the Sustainable Development Goals and Climate Change under Dr. David Nabarro, Special Adviser for the 2030 Agenda for Sustainable Development and Climate Change.

Romo Edelman was a marketing professor of the University of Geneva for the MBA with specialization in International Organizations, IOMBA and has a number of MOOCs marketing courses in Coursera.

Early life 
Claudia was born in Mexico City and was raised in Baja California Sur. She is the daughter of Mexican actress Cecilia Romo and Raul Domingo Gonzalez Soto.

Career 
Gonzalez Romo holds degrees on Communications and Philosophy from Universidad Intercontinental as well as a Masters on Political Communications from the London School of Economics. She speaks 6 languages.

Claudia is the former Chief of Advocacy of UNICEF.  Living for 25 years in Europe, she has led PR, brand and marketing for some of the world's biggest global organizations including the World Economic Forum, the UN Refugee Agency and the Global Fund to fight AIDS, TB and Malaria becoming a recognized strategist in marketing and communications for humanitarian causes.

Claudia was the Head of Marketing for the Global Fund to fight AIDS, TB and Malaria where she also worked on High Net Worth Individuals and led Public Relations and Special Projects for UNHCR, the UN Refugee Agency.

From 1999 to 2007, she was the head of PR, media and special projects for the World Economic Forum. Prior to her experience as part of the Mexican Foreign Affairs service as a diplomat, Claudia started her career as a journalist and press correspondent for Latin American media outlets such as Notimex, Proceso, Monitor.

Gonzalez Romo was appointed chairman of the CMO Summit of Hispanicize 2017. She is a member the Jury of the D&AD Impact Awards on civic engagement 2017 and was a member of the Jury in 2016. She is an official adviser and member of the Jury for the Cannes Lion SDG Awards.

Personal life
Romo lives in New York City, is married to Richard Edelman, and has two children, Joshua and Tamara.

Books 
 Hispanic Stars Rising - Sharing the stories about the experiences, challenges, and successes of Hispanic Stars nationwide.
 Mission Matters: Top Tips To Success, By Adam Torres and Claudia Romo Edelman) - Featuring 18 top female professionals who share their lessons on business and leadership.

References

External links 
 Giovanni Rodriguez (July 12, 2017), "Latino Group Bets On Big Data To Accelerate Diversity Across Silicon Valley"
 claudia-gonzalez
 A Conversation with Dr. Agnes Binagwaho
 Hub Culture Davos 2017 - Claudia Gonzalez Romo, Chief of Public Advocacy at UNICEF
 Unilever & UNICEF: partnerships for change
 Claudia Gonzalez, The Global Fund, introduces herself in 28 seconds
 Claudia Gonzalez - Sages and Scientists 2013

Living people
Alumni of the London School of Economics
Mexican women diplomats
National Autonomous University of Mexico alumni
1971 births